A coffee cup is a container, a cup, for serving coffee and coffee-based drinks. There are three major types: conventional cups used with saucers, mugs used without saucers, and disposable cups. Cups and mugs generally have a handle. Disposable paper cups used for take-out sometimes have fold-out handles, but are more often used with an insulating coffee cup sleeve.

Coffee cups and mugs may be made of glazed ceramic, porcelain, plastic, glass, insulated or uninsulated metal, and other materials. Disposable coffee cups may be made out of paper or polystyrene foam (often mistakenly called Styrofoam).

History
In the past, coffee cups have also been made of bone, clay, and wood.

Shapes and sizes

Espresso 
The Italian Espresso National Institute recommends serving espresso in a white china cup holding 50−100 ml, usually served on a saucer. In the US, espresso cups are sometimes called demitasse cups. The espresso macchiato, made with a shot of espresso and a dash of steamed milk, is also served in a demitasse.

Cappuccino 

The Italian Espresso National Institute recommends serving cappuccino in a china cup holding approximately 160 ml, usually served on a saucer.

Gibraltar or cortado

Some shops serve a cortado in a 4-ounce Libbey Gibraltar glass, calling the drink a Gibraltar.

Cafe drinkware

Cafes use various sizes of coffee cups to serve mochas, lattes, and other coffee drinks. They are typically 225, 336, 460 and sometimes 570 ml. These cups are made of porcelain and shaped to encourage and aid in creating latte art.

Shape innovation
NASA designed "Space Cups" for use by astronauts in the International Space Station. The specially-shaped coffee cups are 3D printed and are used by sucking the liquid out of a bag. The sharp inner corner of the Space Cup allows the liquid to flow toward the drinker's lips through capillary flow. Data from experiments conducted with Space Cups can be used to better the design of fluid systems used in space, such as toilets, oxygen, air conditioning, and water coolants. The data can also be applied to societal uses of fluid systems on Earth, such as improving the design of portable medical blood testers for infectious diseases.

Materials

Porcelain and ceramic
Porcelain and ceramic cups are widely used for coffee. Ceramic is sturdier and cheaper than porcelain, and retains heat better because it is thicker.

Paper
Paper cups are usually lined with wax or plastic to prevent leakage. A famous design of a paper coffee cup is the Anthora, which has become symbolic of New York City daily life.

Bamboo
Bamboo coffee cups, promoted as a "natural" product, are made of powdered bamboo fibres suspended in a glue containing melamine and formaldehyde. The German consumer group Stiftung Warentest has raised concerns these substances constitute a health hazard when used for hot drinks.

Polystyrene
Polystyrene, sometimes known as styrofoam (not actually Styrofoam), is used mostly because of its insulating abilities.

Accessories

Coffee cup lids
Usually made of plastic, the first patent for a coffee cup lid design was filed in 1967, and focused on creating a tight seal between the cup and the lid to reduce leaking and a vent hole to allow steam to escape. However, there was no opening for drinking, and the consumer would have to tear into the lid. In 1986, the Solo Traveler lid was created; it is found in the Museum of Modern Art's 2004 exhibit "Humble Masterpieces". Recent lid designs like the Viora have improved on Solo Traveler's design, which has too small a vent to allow sufficient air to enter while drinking. Louise Harpman, co-owner of the world's largest collection of coffee cup lids and co-author of the book Coffee Lids (Princeton Architectural Press, 2018), suggests that coffee cup lids "represent a major shift in American 'to-go' culture".

Coffee cup sleeve

Coffee cup sleeves are roughly cylindrical sleeves that fit tightly over handle-less paper coffee cups to insulate the drinker's hands from hot coffee. The coffee sleeve was invented and patented by Jay Sorensen in 1993 and are now commonly utilized by coffee houses and other vendors that sell hot beverages dispensed in disposable paper cups.  Coffee sleeves are typically made of textured paperboard, but can be found made of other materials.

Environmental issues 
The United States uses about 120 billion disposable coffee cups per year, almost all of which end up in landfill. Polystyrene foam cups have the reputation of not being recyclable, non-biodegradable, a major part of marine litter, and has various health risks. It is banned as a food and drink container in several U.S. cities including Portland, Ore.; San Francisco, Calif.; and Amherst, Mass. The doughnut company and coffeehouse chain, Dunkin' Donuts, has been criticized for continuing to use styrofoam cups. The company has argued that there is no other material that is as insulated, and has an official statement about their foam cups on their website. However, they have begun phasing in doubled-walled paper cups designed to look like their signature foam cup.

In fact, polystyrene foam cups are easier to recycle than the alternative, paper coffee cups, which are lined with polyethylene to make them impermeable. The few composting facilities which do accept them produce plastic fragments, contaminating the environs, and biodegrading very slowly. Paper coffee cups also release trillions of microplastics-nanoparticles per liter into the water during normal use.

Recently, consumers have been bringing their own reusable coffee cups as a more sustainable option. These may be made of bamboo fiber, polypropylene, and other organic materials such as starch and paper pulp. Only 1 in 400 single-use cups are recycled and media coverage has encouraged consumers to look for alternatives.

References

Coffeeware
Coffee culture